USS Pictor (AF-54) was an Alstede-class stores ship in service with the United States Navy from 1950 to 1969. She was scrapped in 1986.

History
Pictor was laid down under a Maritime Commission contract as SS Great Republic (MC–187) 18 March 1942 by the Moore Dry Dock Company, Oakland, California; She was launched 4 June 1942, sponsored by Mrs. William Craig, Jr.. During outfitting, refrigeration was added to all five holds and she was reclassified as a C2-S-B1(R) type ship and was delivered 29 June 1943.

Commercial service (1943-1950) 
 
From 29 June 1943 until April 1950, she served as SS Great Republic for various private companies, including United Fruit Co., and Pacific Far East Lines of San Francisco, California. Great Republic was responsible for bringing 1,600 tons of turkey to the soldiers serving in France for Thanksgiving 1944.  In April 1950, she was returned to the Maritime Commission and was moored in an inactive status in Suisun Bay, California.

U.S. Navy (1950-1981) 
 
In September 1950, the Navy acquired this merchant ship from the Maritime Administration for conversion into a store ship. Pictor commissioned 13 September 1950, and reported for duty to the U.S. Pacific Fleet.

During the Korean War, she made tours of the Far East to supply perishable foods and dry stores to personnel in Korea and on the Taiwan patrol.
 
After the Korean War, she continued to store refrigerate, transport, and issue, underway and in port, perishable foods and dry stores for the U.S. 1st Fleet and the U.S. 7th Fleet off the U.S. West Coast and in the western Pacific Ocean.
 
During the Vietnam War, she supplied food and dry goods to the 7th Fleet on station off Vietnam.

She decommissioned in December 1969 and was returned to MARAD in August 1970 for lay up in the National Defense Reserve Fleet. She was struck from the Naval Register, 1 June 1976. She was sold on 25 November 1981 to Levine Metals Corp., moored in Richmond, California (USA). All three ships were scrapped at Kaohsiung between December 1986 and 16 June 1987.

Military awards and honors 
Pictor received one battle star during the Korean War:
 Korea, Summer-Fall 1953 Campaign
She received eight campaign stars during the Vietnam War:
 Vietnam Defense
 Vietnamese Counteroffensive
 Vietnam Counteroffensive - Phase II
 Vietnam Counteroffensive - Phase III
 Vietnam Counteroffensive - Phase IV
 Vietnam Counteroffensive - Phase V
 Tet/69 Counteroffensive
 Vietnam Summer-Fall 1969
Her crew was eligible for the following medals:
 National Defense Service Medal
 Korean Service Medal (1)
 Armed Forces Expeditionary Medal (six- 1-Taiwan Straits, 1-Quemoy-Matsu, 4-Vietnam)
 Vietnam Service Medal (8)
 United Nations Service Medal
 Republic of Vietnam Campaign Medal
 Republic of Korea War Service Medal (retroactive)

References

External links 
 

 

Type C2-S-B1 ships
Ships built in Oakland, California
1942 ships
World War II merchant ships of the United States
Alstede-class stores ships
Type C2-S-B1 ships of the United States Navy
Cold War auxiliary ships of the United States
Korean War auxiliary ships of the United States
Vietnam War auxiliary ships of the United States